Abuna Qerellos IV (baptised as Sidarus al-Antuni;  1880 – 1950) was a Coptic priest from Egypt, who came to Ethiopia in 1926, becoming the Archbishop of Ethiopian Orthodox Tewahedo Church. Except for a break between 1936 and 1945 (including the Fascist Italian occupation between 1936 and 1941, following the Second Italo-Ethiopian War) which he spent in exile, Qerellos remained the head of the Ethiopian church until his death.

Qerellos was the last Archbishop of Ethiopia of foreign descent.

References 

1880 births
1950 deaths
Archbishops of Ethiopia
20th-century Oriental Orthodox bishops
20th century in Ethiopia
Egyptian emigrants to Ethiopia